Deer Park Independent School District is a public school district in Deer Park, Texas in the Houston metropolitan area.

History
The school district is traceable to 1922 when a single elementary facility opened on Deer Park's Center Street along Highway 225. In 1929, the small school (approximately thirty students) was greatly expanded, and additional facilities were created in neighboring areas. The district was officially formed for the school year of 1930, and today it serves most of Deer Park, a portion of Pasadena and La Porte, and the unincorporated area of Lynchburg. Its total enrollment is approximately 12,300 students.

In 2009, the school district was rated "recognized" by the Texas Education Agency.

List of schools

Elementary schools
 Deepwater Elementary, established 1954 
 San Jacinto Elementary, established 1957 
 W.A. Carpenter Elementary, established 1959 
 Deer Park Elementary, established 1969 
 Parkwood Elementary, established 1971 
 J.P. Dabbs Elementary, established 1977
 Fairmont Elementary, established 1990
 Early Childhood Center

Junior High schools
 Deer Park Junior High, established 1955 
 Deepwater Junior High, established 1964 
 J.P. Bonnette Junior High, established 1979
 Fairmont Junior High, established 1994

High schools
 Deer Park High School - North Campus (9th grade), established 1951 as original high school, established 1974 as North Campus 
 Deer Park High School - South Campus (10th–12th grades), established 1974
 Deer Park High School - Wolters Campus

University Interscholastic League (UIL) 
Several of Deer Park High School's athletic and fine arts programs have placed in state competitions or won state championships.

1982 UIL AAAAA State Champions- One Act Play
2012 UIL AAAAA State Champions- Softball
2012 UIL AAAAA State Qualifying- One Act Play
2014 UIL AAAAA State Qualifying- One Act Play

References

External links

School districts in Harris County, Texas
Education in Pasadena, Texas
1922 establishments in Texas
School districts established in 1922